A Huntress of Men is a 1916 American silent drama film directed by Lucius J. Henderson and starring Mary Fuller, Joseph W. Girard, and Sidney Bracey. The film was released by Red Feather Photoplays on May 6, 1916.

Plot

Cast
Mary Fuller as The Huntress
Joseph W. Girard as Fleming Harcourt
Sidney Bracey as Ned Ashley (as Sydney Bracey)

Preservation
The film is now considered lost.

References

External links

1916 drama films
Silent American drama films
1916 films
American silent feature films
American black-and-white films
Universal Pictures films
Lost American films
1916 lost films
Lost drama films
1910s American films